Flock is a proprietary messaging and collaboration tool, founded by tech entrepreneur Bhavin Turakhia in 2014. The app is available on Windows, MacOS, Android, iOS and Web.

Flock allows users to configure external apps and integrations from the Flock App Store, and receive notifications and updates directly in Flock.

Flock functions on a freemium pricing model. The application was launched in 2014.

Features 
The primary features of Flock are direct & channel messaging, video conferencing, screen & file sharing, and unlimited chat history.

Teams 
Flock users can create multiple teams for the entire company, a department or for selective members of the organisation. To join a team, users can send invites to others or share the Team URL.

Channels 
Flock users can create public channels and private channels. Public channels are open for everyone to discover and join, and do not require an invitation from the team admin. These channels are meant for sharing knowledge, interests and experiences. Private channels are meant for more focused discussions, and can be joined by invite only.

Native apps 
Flock comes pre-installed with business apps such as:
 Poll app
 Shared To-dos 
 Mailcast 
 Code snippet sharing
 Reminders
 Note sharing
 My Favourites

API 
Flock provides its platform, FlockOS, for developers to build apps, bots and custom integrations on top of Flock. Flock conducts regular hackathons to help young developers build innovative apps by using FlockOS's capabilities.

App Store 
Flock lets users integrate external apps and services from the Flock App Store. Some common apps include Google Drive, Google Analytics, Trello, GitHub, Twitter and Mailchimp. Developers can also publish apps built on FlockOS to the Flock App Store.

Awards 
 Best Business Communication App of the Year by Global Mobile App Summit & Awards, July 2016
 Best Mobile Enterprise Product/Service Award by India Digital Awards 2017, February 2017

References

External links 
 

2014 software
Android (operating system) software
Collaborative software
IOS software
MacOS software
Project management software